In criminology and sociology, the dark figure of crime, or hidden figure of crime, is the amount of unreported or undiscovered crime.

Methodology 
This gap between reported and unreported crimes calls the reliability of official crime statistics into question, but all measures of crime have a dark figure to some degree. The gap in official statistics is largest for less serious crimes.

Comparisons between official statistics, such as the Uniform Crime Reports and the National Incident-Based Reporting System, and victim studies, such as the National Crime Victimization Survey (NCVS), attempt to provide an insight into the amount of unreported crime.

Self-report studies are also used in comparison with official statistics and organized datasets to assess the dark of crime.

See also 
 There are known knowns
 Under-reporting

References

Further reading 
 Moore, S. (1996). Investigating Crime and Deviance. Harpers Collins. , pages 211–220.
 Coleman, C., & Moynihan, J. (1996). Understanding crime data: haunted by the dark figure. Open University Press. .

Crime statistics
Law enforcement theory
Criminology